Langreo is a municipality and town in northern Spain, in Asturias. It is the 4th largest town of Asturias with 43,000 inhabitants. It was an important mining and metallurgical center.

In the neighbourhood fruit and cider are produced, and there are still important coal mines, foundries, and factories for the manufacture of coarse cloth.

History 

According to a legend Langreo was the place where the Moorish governor Munuza was killed while trying to flee from Asturias at the beginning of the Reconquest. Langreo was settled by the Romans, who built a large Roman bridge that is not conserved today.

In the past, it was one of the most important mining and metallurgical points of Spain since the 18th century, and it was also well known because of workers struggles and its cultural life. The 3rd railway to be built in the Iberian Peninsula was the FC of Langreo. The Factory of La Felguera was one of the most important iron works centers in Spain, and the Langreo mines was well known in whole the country.

Because of the Spanish "Industrial Restructuring", Langreo lost its industrial importance, but today the town hosts Bayer, where 100% of the acetylsalicylic acid of the German enterprise are produced. Langreo also holds the technologies centre Valnalón.

Langreo has historic monuments like the church of San Esteban, the Quintana Tower or the Sanctuary of Carbayu. Also preserves good examples of its industrial heritage and it hosts the Siderurgy Museum Of Asturias within the old Felguera Factory, the Samuño Valley and Railway Mining Museum, and the art gallery Pinacoteca Eduardo Úrculo.

Langreo celebrates fiestas of San Pedro and Santiago, and special gastronomic days: Carnival (February) Cider (April) and Fabada (December).

The largest town is Langreo formed by the most important districts: La Felguera (20,000 inhabitants), Sama (10,000), and Riaño, Ciaño, Lada and Barros, also known as parishes.

Parishes
There are eight parishes (administrative divisions) by population:
La Felguera
Sama
Riaño
Ciaño
Lada
Tuilla
Barros
La Venta

Politics

People

David Villa, footballer
Manuel Mejuto González, football referee
Pedro Duro, businessman
Aurelius of Asturias, King of Asturias
Gaspar García Laviana, soldier
Mario Cotelo, footballer
Alberto Coto García, mental calculator
Dámaso Alonso, poet
Narciso Ibáñez Menta, actor
Jesús Fernández Duro, sportman
María Neira, WHO doctor
Carlos Álvarez-Nóvoa, actor

Gallery

References

External links

Ayuntamiento de Langreo

 
Municipalities in Asturias